Darat Izza (also spelled Darat Aza or Darit Izza) is a town in northern Syria, administratively part of the Aleppo Governorate, located  northwest of Aleppo. Nearby localities include Deir Samaan to the north, Anadan to the east and Turmanin to the southwest.

Population
According to the Syria Central Bureau of Statistics (CBS), Darat Izza had a population of 13,525 in the 2004 census. In 2013, its metropolitan area had a population of 41,953.

History
Leading to Darat Izza is a well-preserved stretch of an ancient Roman road dating to the 2nd century CE. During the Ottoman Empire era, Darat Izza was well known for the cotton fabrics it produced.

During the Syrian Civil war against the government of Bashar al-Assad, On June 23, 2012, 25 government supporters were killed in the town by members of the Free Syrian Army (FSA). The government claimed they were ordinary citizens while the FSA and the Syrian Observatory for Human Rights claimed they were pro-government Shabiha militiamen. They were part of a larger group kidnapped by a rebel group. The fate of the others kidnapped was unknown. Many of the corpses of the shabiha militia killed were in military uniform.

A secondary school has turned into a police station, a courthouse and a temporary town hall run by the rebels. It is part of a nascent rebel administration that is taking shape in areas of the country where Assad's authority has disappeared as his security forces try to secure control of Syria's main cities: Aleppo, Damascus, Homs and others. A defector from the Assad administration, Abdul Hadi heads a "revolutionary" security force made up of some 40 officers, all of them former policemen in the government. At times, Abdul Hadi's role seems more akin to that of a local mayor than a police officer. Among his self-assigned responsibilities, he monitors local bread supplies, urging bakeries to adjust production according to need. Recent rebel attacks on a government-owned wheat silo and army gasoline depots have given them access to new supplies. On 21 November, rebels attacked the nearby Sheikh Suleiman base (which was under siege for over two months), but were repelled from the area by an army counterattack, in which 25 rebels were killed. on 10 December, the base was taken by opposition forces. A little over 100 regime troops that were left inside the base retreated to the scientific building wearing gas masks.

The town was under the control of the Islamic State of Iraq and the Levant since September 2013, but they withdrew following a wide-scale offensive led by the Army of Mujahedeen and the Islamic Front.

Sabah and A Haber have stated in 2017 that the Turkish Armed Forces may be establishing a base by the Sheikh Barakat Mountain to facilitate an advance into Idlib Governorate.  Recently, the town came under the control of the Syrian National Army.

On 17 February 2022, a fighter of the Syrian Opposition was shot dead by a Syrian army sniper during a skirmish near the town.

References

Bibliography

Populated places in Mount Simeon District
Towns in Syria